Elefun is a children's game from Hasbro. The object is where the player uses the net to catch butterflies from a plastic elephant's metre (3.28')-long trunk, a plastic chute through which the paper butterflies travel, propelled up by a motor in the elephant. It was released in 1993. This was repeated twice between 2003 and 2009, starting with the marketing under its "Elefun and Friends" name. This consists of Hungry Hungry Hippos, Mouse Trap, Chasing Cheeky, and Gator Golf.

A 2008 direct-to-video short film adaptation was released exclusively as Elefun and Friends: A Tangled Tale. The film was directed by Darrell Van Citters in production of Renegade Animation with songs composed by Jared Faber.

In 2010, it made an appearance as the  daily prize in the season 5 episode 14 episode of Fetch! With Ruff Ruffman.

Playskool, a subsidiary of Hasbro, created the spin-offs as the "Elefun Busy Ball Popper" in 2011. A golden butterfly was added to the game in 2012. There is also a female version called Belefun.

About
Elefun was designed by Omri Rothschild & Boaz Coster in 1993. It is suggested to be played between 2 and 4 players and takes approximately 10 minutes to play.

Details
Elefun is a children's game suggested to be played by preschoolers ages 3–6. The motorized elephant blows nylon butterflies into the air and all the players try and catch them in their nets. Players can also grab the butterflies off the ground to collect them in their net. The player who collects the most butterflies once the elephant is done blowing them earns a butterfly token on their net. Also, the player who catches the special blue butterfly wins a token. The first player to collect three butterfly tokens wins the game.

Versions
Musical Freddy and His Flying Fish is the same game as Elefun, but instead of an elephant that blows butterflies, there is a large fish that blows out smaller fish. There is also a Winnie the Pooh version called Pooh's Blustery Day.

Advertising
The commercial for this game featured a jingle sung to the tune of The Arkansas Traveler.

Publishers
Elefun was published by the following: 
Hasbro
Hilco Corporation
Milton Bradley
Parker Brothers
Playskool (Elefun Busy Ball Popper)

References

Milton Bradley Company games
Children's games